The media in the San Francisco Bay Area has historically focused on San Francisco but also includes two other major media centers, Oakland and San Jose. The Federal Communications Commission, Nielsen Media Research, and other similar media organizations treat the San Francisco-Oakland-San Jose Area as one entire media market. The region hosts to one of the oldest radio stations in the United States still in existence, KCBS (AM) (740 kHz), founded by engineer Charles Herrold in 1909. As the home of Silicon Valley, the Bay Area is also a technologically advanced and innovative region, with many companies involved with Internet media or influential websites.

Print

The first newspaper published by Americans in California was The Californian, printed in Monterey in 1846 announcing the Mexican–American War, written half in English and half Spanish. The press was moved to San Francisco and printing started up again on May 22, 1847 in competition with the weekly California Star, beginning that January. The first newspaper published solely in English in San Francisco was The Star published by Mormon pioneer Sam Brannan before San Francisco was renamed from Yerba Buena in 1847. Both efforts suspended publication in the face of the California Gold Rush. By August, The Californian had resumed publication, but by November 1848, both papers were bought and merged, then renamed the Alta California.

The press that once printed The Californian was moved to the Sacramento area to be used on the Placer Times. The press was again moved and began publishing the Motherlode's first paper, the Sonora Herald, then taken to Columbia to print the Columbia Star. Within a few years of the discovery of gold, mother lode towns all had multiple competing journals. Before 1860, California had 57 newspapers and periodicals serving an average readership of 290,000.

James King of William began publishing the Daily Evening Bulletin in San Francisco in October, 1855 and built it into the highest circulation paper in the city. He criticized a city supervisor named James P. Casey, who, on the afternoon of the story about him, ran in the paper, shot and mortally wounded King. Casey was lynched by the early vigilante committee. The Morning Call was established and began publishing in December 1856, and later merged with the Bulletin to become the long-running Call-Bulletin. The San Francisco Chronicle debuted in June, 1865 as the Dramatic Chronicle, founded by Charles and M.H. de Young aged 19 and 17.

In 1887, young William Randolph Hearst took over his father's Daily Examiner, which became the flagship of his national chain.

Fremont Older became editor of the San Francisco Bulletin in 1895 and took up the struggle against the powerful Southern Pacific Railroad and along with fellow Californian Lincoln Steffens, became a well-known muckraker and the first objective observer to accuse District Attorney Charles Fickert of the framing of labor radical Thomas Mooney.

The oldest African-American newspaper, still active in the 1930s, was the California Eagle. It appeared first in Los Angeles in 1879. The first French journals, the Californien and the Gazette Republicane both began in 1850, and were followed by the Courrier du Pacifique in 1852. Both the first German and first Italian papers, the California Demokrat (1852) and the Voce del Popolo (1859) were founded in San Francisco and had long runs. Chinese in California have published many newspapers, the first being the Gold Hills News in 1854.

Noted journalists, writers, cartoonists and publishers have passed through San Francisco's media world, including:

 Herbert Asbury
 Gertrude Atherton
 Ambrose Bierce
 Winifred Bonfils
 John Bruce
 Bruce Brugmann
 Gelett Burgess
 Herb Caen
 William Martin Camp
 Phil Elwood
 C.H. Garrigues

 Henry George
 Harold Gilliam
 Rube Goldberg
 Bret Harte
 William Randolph Hearst
 Warren Hinkle
 Art Hoppe
 Wallace Irwin
 Will Irwin
 Harry Jupiter

 James King of William
 Jack London
 Charles McCabe
 Joaquin Miller
 Prentice Mulford
 Fremont Older
 Randy Shilts
 Charles Warren Stoddard
 Mark Twain
 John L. Wasserman

By the early decades of the 20th century, San Francisco supported four major dailies and numerous influential weeklies. The dailies were the San Francisco Call (later Call-Bulletin), the San Francisco Examiner, the San Francisco Chronicle and the Scripps-Howard-owned Daily News. The weeklies included the Wasp, the Argonaut, the Labor Clarion, the Coast Seamen's Journal, Emanu-el, Liberator and the News Letter.

Today, several newspapers, covering community, regional, national, and international news, and community-specific papers, catering to niche markets and individual neighborhoods, are in circulation in the San Francisco Bay Area. The major English-language newspapers include the daily East Bay Times, San Francisco Chronicle, San Francisco Examiner, and San Jose Mercury News. The weekly alternative papers are the Metro Silicon Valley, East Bay Express, and SF Weekly. The Epoch Times, Singtao Daily, World Journal, and Kangzhongguo are among the Asian newspapers that serve the Bay Area.

Newspapers

 East Bay Times (Walnut Creek) – daily broadsheet
 The Daily News (Palo Alto) – weekly tabloid
 East Bay Express (Oakland) – weekly alternative
 Marin Independent Journal (Novato) – daily broadsheet
 The Epoch Times (California) – weekly broadsheet
 The Mercury News (San Jose) – daily broadsheet
 Metro Silicon Valley (San Jose) – weekly alternative
 El Observador (San Jose) Spanish/English bilingual weekly
 Palo Alto Daily Post (Palo Alto) daily tabloid
 Palo Alto Weekly (Palo Alto) weekly tabloid
 The Recorder (San Francisco) – daily legal newspaper
 San Francisco Business Times (San Francisco) – weekly business
 San Francisco Chronicle (San Francisco) – daily broadsheet
 San Francisco Daily Journal (San Francisco) – daily legal newspaper
 The San Francisco Examiner (San Francisco) – daily tabloid
 Silicon Valley Business Journal (San Jose) – weekly business
 Several other community-based papers, published on a daily or weekly basis

Former newspapers
 Alameda Times-Star (Alameda)
 The Argus (Fremont) – daily broadsheet
 Contra Costa Times (Walnut Creek) – daily broadsheet
 Daily Review (Hayward) – daily broadsheet
 Oakland Tribune (Oakland) – daily broadsheet
 Peninsula Times Tribune (Palo Alto) – daily broadsheet
 Redwood City Daily News (Redwood City) daily tabloid
 San Francisco Bay Guardian – weekly alternative
 San Francisco Progress thrice-weekly broadsheet
 SF Weekly (San Francisco) – weekly walternative
 San Mateo County Times (San Mateo) – daily broadsheet

Ethnic newspapers
Aside from the major English broadsheets, the Bay Area also publishes newspapers catering to the large ethnic communities in the region, including:
 Calitoday (San Jose) Vietnamese/English bilingual semiweekly
 The Epoch Times (San Francisco) – Chinese daily broadsheet
 Hromada (Corte Madera) - Ukrainian - It was co-created in 2017 by Lesya Castillo, who in 2022 served as the main editor.
 International Daily News (San Francisco) – Chinese daily broadsheet
 Kanzhongguo Times (Milpitas) – Chinese
 The Oakland Post (Oakland) – African American
 San Francisco Bay View (San Francisco) – African American
 Sing Tao Daily (Brisbane) – Chinese daily broadsheet
 Vietnam Daily News (San Jose) Vietnamese daily
 Vision Hispana (Alameda) – Hispanic
 World Journal (San Francisco) – Chinese daily broadsheet
 Several other Asian and Hispanic newspapers
Former ethnic newspapers
 Cái Đình Làng (San Francisco) Vietnamese
 Nuevo Mundo (San Jose) Spanish weekly
 SaigonUSA (San Jose) Vietnamese semiweekly
 Thái Bình (San Francisco) Vietnamese
 Trống Đồng (San Jose) Vietnamese weekly
 Viet Mercury (San Jose) Vietnamese weekly
 East West The Chinese American Journal (San Francisco) Chinese English weekly
 Việt Nam Tự Do (San Jose) Vietnamese daily
 Viet Tribune (San Jose) Vietnamese weekly
 Vietnam Family (San Jose) Vietnamese weekly
 Vietnam Mom (San Jose) Vietnamese monthly
 Vietnam Times (San Jose) Vietnamese daily
 VTimes (San Jose) Vietnamese

Several college newspapers also exist as well in the Bay Area, including:

 The Advocate (Contra Costa College) weekly broadsheet
 The Campanil (Mills College)
 The Daily Californian (UC Berkeley) daily broadsheet
 Golden Gate XPress (San Francisco State University)
 Pioneer (CSU Hayward) weekly
 San Francisco Foghorn (University of San Francisco) weekly tabloid
 The Santa Clara (Santa Clara University) weekly tabloid
 Spartan Daily (San Jose State University) thrice-weekly broadsheet
 The Stanford Daily (Stanford University) daily broadsheet
 Synapse (UC San Francisco)

Magazines

 7x7
 Afar
 Bay Nature
 The Believer
 Bob Cut Mag
 The Bold Italic
 Dwell
 Hyphen
 McSweeney's magazine and publishing house
 Macworld
 Mother Jones
 Salon
 San Francisco magazine
 SOMA
 Sunset
 Wired
 FourTwoNine

Television
The San Francisco Bay Area is currently the sixth-largest television market in the United States, with four of the six major U.S. television networks (ABC, CBS, NBC, and Fox) having owned-and-operated stations serving the region. All five, plus major Spanish-language networks Telemundo, Univision, and UniMás, also own and operate stations that serve the San Francisco market.  KPIX, Channel 5, was San Francisco's first television station when it signed on the air on December 22, 1948; it was also the first commercial television station in northern California.

In addition to local television channels, several television networks have regional news bureaus in the San Francisco Bay Area, including BBC, CNN, ESPN, MSNBC, Al Jazeera America, Russia Today, CCTV America, and PBS. Regional sports networks NBC Sports Bay Area and NBC Sports California both originate from the studios of NBC-Telemundo duopoly KNTV-KSTS.

Radio

The San Francisco Bay Area is currently the fourth-largest radio market in the United States, with all of the major U.S. radio networks having affiliates serving the region. While most radio stations targeting the Bay Area originate in San Francisco, it also includes stations broadcasting from San Jose, mostly to South Bay listeners and other parts of the Bay Area depending on reception. The San Jose radio market ranks as the 37th largest, but is considered an embedded market within the Bay Area.

Radio broadcasting in the region can be traced back to the efforts of Charles Herrold and Lee de Forest as early as 1907; Herrold would ultimately establish station KQW in 1921, now known as KCBS.

Online

Online publications
Besides websites that exist in addition to print publications, many publications that only exist online have come into existence in recent years. The most notable include:
 Asian Week
 Curbed SF
 SF Public Press
 SFist
 The Tender
 AJ+, part of Al Jazeera Media Network

Internet and social media
As the home of Silicon Valley, several high technology companies involved with Internet media or social media are either headquartered or have a significant presence in the Bay Area. These include the following:
 Facebook
 Google
 Netflix
 Pandora Radio
 Twitter
 Yahoo!
 YouTube

See also

 Center for Media Justice

References

 
San Francisco
Art in the San Francisco Bay Area
Culture in the San Francisco Bay Area
Economy of the San Francisco Bay Area
San Francisco Bay Area literature